LeRoy Rooker is the director of the United States Department of Education's Family Policy Compliance Office (FPCO), and has held this job since 1988. The FPCO primarily oversees implementation of the Family Educational Rights and Privacy Act (FERPA) and the Protection of Pupil Rights Amendment (PPRA).

In that capacity, he administers the Family Educational Rights and Privacy Act (FERPA) and the Protection of Pupil Rights Amendment: laws and policies designed to help protect the rights of America's 58 million students.

External links
  Family Policy Compliance Office (FPCO)
 LeRoy Rooker, Head, Family Policy Compliance Office

Living people
Privacy law in the United States
United States Department of Education officials
United States federal education legislation
Year of birth missing (living people)